Buenavista is a district of the San Carlos canton, in the Alajuela province of Costa Rica.

Geography 
Buenavista has an area of  km² which makes it the smallest district in the canton by area, and an elevation of  metres with a range between 500 and 900 meters above sea level.

It is located in the northern region of the country and borders with 2 districts; Florencia to the N / NO, Quesada to the N / NE. While to the south it borders with the canton of Zarcero.

Its head, the town of Buenavista, is located 13.3 Km (35 minutes) to the NW of Ciudad Quesada and 94.9 Km (2 hours 37 minutes) to the NW of San Jose, the nation's capital.

The grounds of Buenavista are distinguished by being very broken, with a type of steep soil and steep slopes.

Economy 

This is a special place for dairy farming.

It also has a health post and a school and only a grocery store.

It has very little infrastructure, the majority are houses of room.

Through the installation of a hydroelectric project, the community managed to increase its economic and communal development.

Thanks to the construction of the new San Carlos-San Ramón highway, Buena Vista will become a more crowded region.

Demographics 

For the 2011 census, Buenavista had a population of  inhabitants.
Buenavista is one of the districts with the lowest number of inhabitants of the country, it has about 325 inhabitants.

Transportation

Road transportation 
The district is covered by the following road routes:
 National Route 141

References 

Districts of Alajuela Province
Populated places in Alajuela Province